Bardhyl Ajeti (May 29, 1977 in Prilepnica, SFR Yugoslavia – 28 June 2005 in Milan, Italy) was a reporter for the Albanian-language daily newspaper Bota Sot, published in Pristina. He wrote daily editorials for Bota Sot and supported anticrime campaign of international authorities in arresting former members of the Kosova Liberation Army (KLA). Bota Sot also supported Ibrahim Rugova, a leader of ethnic Albanian party, the Democratic League of Kosovo.

Several weeks before he was shot, Ajeti had written a complaint to the Temporary Media Commissioner, which is internationally supervised media regulator in Kosovo. In his complaint he stated that his life had been threatened.

He was shot by unidentified assassins on 3 June 2005, while he was driving a car on the way to Pristina. On 28 June 2005 he died of gunshot wounds in hospital in Milano, Italy. Police spokesman said that Bardhyl Ajeti was shot in the head at close range.

In the Country Reports on Human Rights Practices of the United States Department of State is emphasised that investigation of the killing of Bardhyl Ajeti had no developments.

Bardhyl Ajeti was not the only journalist of Bota Sot who was killed in Kosovo. Bekim Kastrati, killed on 19 October 2001 in the village Lauša near Pristina, was also journalist of Bota Sot. The drive-by shooting of Bardhyl Ajeti was one of the apparently politically motivated killings of Kosovo Albanians during 2005. The Association of Journalists of Serbia (UNS) and Organization for Security and Co-operation in Europe condemned the attack on Ajeti, emphasizing that his case and several other attacks on journalists on Kosovo have not been solved.

See also
List of journalists killed in Europe

Notes

References

External links 
 Text about Bardhyl Ajeti published on the CPJ website

1977 births
2005 deaths
Kosovan journalists
20th-century journalists